Laurel Hill is a city in Okaloosa County, Florida, United States. The population was 537 at the 2010 census. It is part of the Fort Walton Beach–Crestview–Destin Metropolitan Statistical Area.

Geography

Laurel Hill is located at  (30.965369, –86.459149).

Demographics

As of the census of 2000, there were 549 people, 223 households, and 158 families residing in the city. The racial makeup of the city was 77.23% White, 21.68% African American, 0.18% Native American, 0.73% from other races, and 0.18% from two or more races. Hispanic or Latino of any race were 1.09% of the population.

There were 223 households, out of which 30.9% had children under the age of 18 living with them, 49.8% were married couples living together, 17.0% had a female householder with no husband present, and 29.1% were non-families. 25.6% of all households were made up of individuals, and 11.7% had someone living alone who was 65 years of age or older.  The average household size was 2.46 and the average family size was 2.93.

In the city, the population was spread out, with 26.8% under the age of 18, 5.8% from 18 to 24, 27.7% from 25 to 44, 24.0% from 45 to 64, and 15.7% who were 65 years of age or older.  The median age was 39 years. For every 100 females, there were 90.0 males.  For every 100 females age 18 and over, there were 85.3 males.

The median income for a household in the city was $25,385, and the median income for a family was $28,281. Males had a median income of $25,809 versus $17,500 for females. The per capita income for the city was $12,949.  About 18.0% of families and 21.6% of the population were below the poverty line, including 25.2% of those under age 18 and 9.4% of those age 65 or over.

History and other features

The area which is now Laurel Hill was one of the first post American annexation English-speaking settlements in Florida.  There had been settlements by English-speaking loyalists in Florida during the American Revolution.  Settlers were documented establishing a community, originally known as Almirante, soon after Florida's acquisition by the United States in 1821.  In the 1880s, railroad access to north-west Florida opened up a booming lumber industry, with the Yellow River Railroad reaching the Almirante (Laurel Hill) area by 1892.  In 1895 Almirante, then just a small logging and farming community, was platted and renamed Laurel Hill, the name purportedly inspired by a large laurel tree which grew in the center of the community.  Growing rapidly, the community was incorporated by the Florida Legislature in 1905.

Although in 1915 Laurel Hill was the largest community in newly created Okaloosa County, the town lost out becoming the Okaloosa county seat to the more centrally located town of Crestview.  Laurel Hill's economic fortunes went into a decline after World War I, a waning intensified by the Florida land speculation collapse of the 1920s which resulted in the closing of Laurel Hill's only bank.  In order to install infrastructure improvements and to re-stimulate the community, Laurel Hill was reincorporated in 1953.

Once served by the Louisville & Nashville Railroad, which purchased the Yellow River Railroad in 1906, the line was abandoned and lifted in the 1980s.

 First held in 1992, the Laurel Hill Hobo Festival is an annual event scheduled for the first Saturday in October.
 The team name for the Laurel Hill School is the Hoboes, allegedly the only school in the US with this team name.

Churches

 South Ebenezer Baptist Church
 Ebenezer Baptist Church
 Laurel Hill Presbyterian Church
 Laurel Hill First Baptist Church
 Mt Zion Baptist Church

Schools

 Okaloosa Comprehensive Head Start
 Laurel Hill School

References

External links

 Northwest Florida Daily News

Cities in Okaloosa County, Florida
Populated places established in 1895
Cities in Florida
1895 establishments in Florida